"Ye olde" is a pseudo–Early Modern English phrase originally used to suggest a connection between a place or business and Merry England (or the medieval period). The term dates to 1896 or earlier; it continues to be used today, albeit now more frequently in an ironically anachronistic and kitsch fashion.

History

 
The use of the term ye to mean "the" derives from Early Modern English, in which the was written , employing the Old English letter thorn, . The connection became less obvious after the letter thorn was discontinued in favour of the digraph . Today, ye is often incorrectly pronounced as the archaic pronoun of the same spelling.

See also
Mojibake
Olde English District
Sensational spelling

References

External links

Antique English: Why is 'ye' used instead of 'the' in antique English?
THE versus YE: historical data from English spelling 1450-1734

English words and phrases